Sudan II (Solvent Orange 7, C.I. 12140, C18H16N2O) is a lysochrome (fat-soluble dye) azo dye used for staining of triglycerides in frozen sections, and some protein bound lipids and lipoproteins on paraffin sections. It has the appearance of red powder with melting point 156–158 °C and maximum absorption at 493(420) nm.

Uses
In industry, it is used to color nonpolar substances like oils, fats, waxes, greases, various hydrocarbon products, and acrylic emulsions.

It was used as food dye under the designation FD&C Red 32 in the US until the FDA banned its use in food in 1956 due to toxicity.

References

Azo dyes
Sudan dyes
2-Naphthols
Alkyl-substituted benzenes